The Pueblo Bighorns were a minor league baseball team which played in Pueblo, Colorado.  They were a member of the Texas–Louisiana League, an expansion team owned and organized by the league's investors, and brought professional baseball back to Pueblo.  They played the first half of their inaugural season, until financial difficulty, lack of corporate sponsorship and resulting poor fan attendance (due to the franchise's hasty organization) forced the Bighorns to disband.  Like all TLL clubs, they were unaffiliated with Major League Baseball.  The team played at Rawlings Field on the campus of Colorado State University Pueblo.

Team Record

Players
 Brian M. Ahern, RHP
 Robby Alexander, RHP
 Bobby Applegate, RHP
 Sam Arminio, RHP
 James P. Boynewicz, RHP
 Ramon A. Cedeño
 Raymond C. Cervantes
 Sean L. Collins
 Rob Darnell
 David C. Dawson, RHP
 Robert L. Dickerson
 David Escoto
 Benjamin P. Fleetham, RHP
 Fabio M. Gomez
 Eduardo Gonzalez
 Andre G. Johnson
 Jack E. Johnson
 Benji Kaber
 Robin Lindsey
 Dan E. Madsen
 Robert Magallanes
 Kelly J. Mann
 Sean Martinez, RHP
 David May, LHP
 Eric P. Mediavilla
 Daryl J. Moore, RHP
 Robert D. Moore, RHP
 Brian P. Nelson, RHP
 Jamie Nelson
 Jorge Perez
 Jose A. Perozo
 Eric Rice, LHP
 Sammie Ridley, RHP
 Glenn M. Sullivan
 Shawn Tipton, RHP
 Wayne L. Wilkerson
 Kip E. Yaughn, RHP

References

External links
Baseball Reference

Defunct minor league baseball teams
Sports in Pueblo, Colorado
Defunct baseball teams in Colorado
Texas-Louisiana League teams
1995 establishments in Colorado
1995 disestablishments in Colorado
Defunct independent baseball league teams
Baseball teams established in 1995
Sports clubs disestablished in 1995
Baseball teams disestablished in 1995